Scleria iostephana is a plant in the family Cyperaceae.

Distribution and habitat
Scleria iostephana grows naturally in tropical Africa. Its habitat is forests, woodlands, grasslands, bogs and marshes.

References

iostephana
Flora of West Tropical Africa
Flora of West-Central Tropical Africa
Flora of East Tropical Africa
Flora of Zambia
Plants described in 1956